Tutt Hill could refer to:

 Tutt Hill, a promontory on the Gower peninsula, Wales
 Tutt Hill in Kent